Nimble was built at Plymouth in 1813. Initially she engaged in a triangular trade between Africa, Brazil, and Britain. She then sailed between Britain and the eastern Mediterranean. She was twice plundered by pirates, once while on her way to Brazil and the some years later as she was on her way to Smyrna. In 1824 her owners had her lengthened. In 1828–1830 Nimble sailed to Mauritius under a licence from the British East India Company (EIC). She was last listed in 1833.

Career
Nimble first appeared in Lloyd's Register (LR) in 1816.

On 25 June 1816 Nimble, Liang, master, arrived at Portsmouth. She sailed two days later for Africa. On 10 July she was at Madeira. On 8 February 1817 she was at Cape Coast Castle, having come from Bahia. On 28 June 1817 she arrived back at Portsmouth from Sierra Leone; On the 30th she was at Gravesend, reportedly from Senegal. On 21 August she sailed from Gravesend, bound for Cape Coast Castle. A week later she was at Falmouth, on her way to Africa.

On 5 February 1818 Nimble arrived at Bahia. On her way from Cape Coast a pirate or privateer had plundered her of cargo worth $2000.

On 18 November 1822, as Nimble, Wishart, master, was returning to London from Smyrna, she ran foul of Nesbit, Grey, master, which was on her way to Jamaica from London. Both vessels put into Ramsgate. Nesbit had lost her anchor, bowsprit, and cables; Nimble had lost her anchor and cable, and sustained other damage.

In 1824 her owners had Nimble lengthened, which increased her burthen by over 30%.

In 1827 as Nimble was sailing to Smyrna from London pirates plundered her of part of her cargo, stores, and men's clothes.  and  fitted out three misticos that on 27 June 1827, at Andros, captured a row galley, armed with one gun. The galley's 30, or 35 crew members escaped ashore. On the galley the British found Nimbles log book, some oars from the British vessel Brothers, and several other English goods. Cambrian and Rose received head money for the action.

In 1813 the EIC had lost its monopoly on the trade between India and Britain. British ships were then free to sail to India or the Indian Ocean under a license from the EIC.

In 1829 or so new owners sailed Nimble to Île de France (Mauritius).

Fate
Nimble was no longer listed in LR after 1833. The last clear mention of her was a report in July that Nimble, Parsons, master, had returned from Marseilles.

Notes

Citations

References
 
 

1813 ships
Age of Sail merchant ships of England
Piracy
Ships attacked and captured by pirates